Jayden Gengan (born 6 October 2000) is a South African cricketer. He made his List A debut for KwaZulu-Natal Inland in the 2018–19 CSA Provincial One-Day Challenge on 24 March 2019.

References

External links
 

2000 births
Living people
South African cricketers
KwaZulu-Natal Inland cricketers
Place of birth missing (living people)